The 2017 Horizon League men's soccer tournament was the 30th edition of the competition. The tournament determined the year's Horizon League men's college soccer champion, as well as the conference's automatic berth in the 2017 NCAA Division I men's soccer tournament, which determines the national champion of college soccer for the season. 

Two-time defending tournament champions, the UIC Flames, won their third-consecutive Horizon League title, and their sixth overall, defeating the regular season champions, Green Bay Phoenix in the final. UIC earned a berth into the NCAA Tournament, where they lost in the first round of the tournament, 1-4 to the Wisconsin Badgers. No other teams in the conference earned an at-large berth into the tournament.

Background 

Six teams participated in the tournament, and they were seeded based on their regular season conference record, or matches against other college soccer programs also in the conference. The Horizon League regular season winner and runner-up earned byes to the semifinal round of the tournament as the top two seeds, while the se

Seeding

Schedule

Bracket

Awards and honors 

 MVP: Joel Leon, UIC

All Tournament Team

See also 
 2017 Horizon League Women's Soccer Tournament

References

External links 
Horizon League Men's Soccer Tournament Central

Horizon League Men's Soccer
Horizon League Men's Soccer Tournament